Tomáš Kubík (born 22 January 2002) is a Slovak professional footballer who plays for 2. Liga club Púchov, on loan from Ružomberok of the Fortuna Liga, as a midfielder.

Club career

MFK Ružomberok
Kubík made his Fortuna Liga debut for Ružomberok against Slovan Bratislava on 13 February 2021, replacing Adam Brenkus.

References

External links
 MFK Ružomberok official club profile 
 Futbalnet profile 
 
 

2002 births
Living people
People from Trstená
Sportspeople from the Žilina Region
Slovak footballers
Association football midfielders
MFK Ružomberok players
MŠK Púchov players
Slovak Super Liga players
2. Liga (Slovakia) players